Du New Morning au Zénith is a 1994 double album recorded live by the trio Fredericks Goldman Jones. Composed of 31 tracks, it contains many successful songs from Goldman's previous albums and from the trio's two studio albums Fredericks Goldman Jones and Rouge. It was released on 18 May 1995 and was successful in francophone countries.

Recording and releases
It was recorded between the 26 April 1994 and the 12 June 1994, first at the New Morning in Paris (the first 14 tracks of the first CD), then during the Rouge concert tour, at the Summum in Grenoble and at the Patinoire de Malley in Lausanne.

The money raised by the four concerts at the New Morning in April 1994 was donated to Amnesty International. During the show, a cover version of Aretha Franklin's song "Think" was performed.

In 2006, 14 performances from the album were included on a DVD box set Souvenirs de tournée - Du New Morning au Zénith.

Chart performances
In France, the album went straight to number-two on 14 May 1995 and remained there for four consecutive weeks, being unable to dislodge Céline Dion's D'eux which was atop then. It totaled 16 weeks in the top ten and 26 weeks on the chart (top 50). It earned a Platinum disc for over 300,000 copies sold.

In Belgium (Wallonia), the album peaked at number two for two weeks and stayed for 24 weeks in the top 50. It was ranked for five weeks in the top 50 in Belgium (Flanders).

Track listings

Disc 1
 "Veiller tard" (Goldman) — 5:44
 "Ne lui dis pas" (Goldman) — 5:50
 "Quelque chose de bizarre" (Goldman) — 3:57
 "Jeanine médicament blues" (Goldman) — 4:36
 "Il part" (Goldman) — 4:46
 "Il y a" (Goldman) — 5:03
 "P'tit blues peinard" (Goldman) — 3:33
 "Confidentiel" (Goldman) — 3:33
 "C'est pas d'l'amour" (Goldman) — 5:59
 "Un, deux, trois" (Goldman) — 4:01
 "Pas toi" (Goldman) — 5:23
 "Think" (Franklin, White) — 2:50
 "Knock on Wood" (Floyd, Stephen) — 3:47
 "Tobacco Road" (Loudermilk) — 5:30
 "Serre-moi" [début] (Goldman) — 3:09
 "Des vôtres" (Goldman) — 3:45
 "Envole-moi" (Goldman) — 5:35

Disc 2
 "Que disent les chansons du monde ?" (Goldman) — 6:04
 "Comme toi" (Goldman) — 4:41
 "Être le premier" (Goldman) — 6:18
 "Je commence demain" (Goldman) — 5:19
 "Des vies" (Goldman) — 5:51
 "On n'a pas changé" (Goldman) — 7:18
 "Frères" (Goldman) — 5:44
 "Juste après" (Goldman) — 5:22
 "À nos actes manqués" (Goldman) — 4:22
 "Fermer les yeux" (Goldman) — 8:33
 "Il suffira d'un signe" (Goldman) — 4:25
 "Rouge" (Goldman) — 6:47
 "Puisque tu pars" (Goldman) — 2:49
 "Serre-moi [fin](Goldman) — 2:56

Personnel
 Beckie Bell, Yvone Jones – chorus
 Erick Benzi – percussion
 Jacky Mascarel, Philippe Grandvoinet – keyboards
 Claude Le Perron – bass
 Christophe Deschamps – drum kit
 Michael Jones – guitar
 Claude Gassian – booklet
 Tom Lord-Alge – engineer, mixing
 Jean Remy Mazenc – multi instruments
 Andy Scott – mixing
 Alain Aboulker, Pierre Buisson, Christian Desille, Emmanuel Goulet, Frédéric Perrinet, Rene Weis – assistants
 Yannick Wild, Alexis Grosbois – producer

Release history

Charts

Certifications

References

Jean-Jacques Goldman albums
Carole Fredericks albums
1995 live albums